Access to Justice Act may refer to 

 Access to Justice Act 1999, an Act of the Parliament of the UK
 Equal Access to Justice Act, US federal judiciary legislation
 Servicemember's Access to Justice Act, US federal defense and national security legislation